The Nature of the Beast is a 1919 British silent drama film directed by Cecil M. Hepworth and starring Alma Taylor, Gerald Ames and James Carew. The screenplay concerns a Belgian refugee who marries a British aircraft manufacturer. It was based on a 1918 novel of the same title by E. Temple Thurston.

Plot summary
During the First World War, a Belgian refugee marries a British aircraft manufacturer, but a former German enemy tries to force her to give over secret documents.

Cast
 Alma Taylor as Anna de Berghem  
 Gerald Ames as John Ingledew  
 James Carew as Kleinenberger  
 Gwynne Herbert as Mrs. de Berghem  
 Stephen Ewart as Sir James Standish 
 Mary Dibley as Lady Standish 
 Victor Prout as Mr. de Berghem  
 Christine Rayner as Guest  
 John MacAndrews as Friend

References

Bibliography
 Palmer, Scott. British Film Actors' Credits, 1895-1987. McFarland, 1988.

External links

1919 films
1919 drama films
British drama films
British silent feature films
Films directed by Cecil Hepworth
Films set in England
Films based on British novels
Hepworth Pictures films
British black-and-white films
1910s English-language films
1910s British films
Silent drama films